Cranbrook may refer to:

People
 Earl of Cranbrook, a title in the Peerage of the United Kingdom
 Gathorne Gathorne-Hardy, 1st Earl of Cranbrook (1814–1906), British Conservative politician
 John Stewart Gathorne-Hardy, 2nd Earl of Cranbrook (1839–1911), Conservative Member of Parliament

Places

Australia
Cranbrook, Bellevue Hill, historic residence in Sydney
Cranbrook, Queensland, a suburb of Townsville
 Cranbrook, Tasmania, in Glamorgan Land District
 Cranbrook, Western Australia
 Shire of Cranbrook, Western Australia

Canada
 Cranbrook, British Columbia, a city
 Cranbrook Memorial Arena
 Cranbrook (electoral district), existing from 1903 to 1963
 Cranbrook/Canadian Rockies International Airport
 Cranbrook, Ontario, a pre-Confederation settlement near Listowel

England
 Cranbrook Castle, an Iron Age Hill fort in Devon 
 Cranbrook, Devon, a new town in East Devon
 Cranbrook (Devon) railway station
 Cranbrook, Kent
 Cranbrook Colony, a group of artists active from 1853 onwards
 Cranbrook School, Kent
 Cranbrook (Kent) railway station
 Cranbrook, London, a district in the London Borough of Redbridge
 Cranbrook Estate, a housing estate in East London

Educational facilities
 Cranbrook Educational Community, an education, research and museum complex in Bloomfield Hills, Michigan, USA
 Cranbrook Schools
 Cranbrook School, Ilford, England
 Cranbrook School, Kent, England
 Cranbrook School, Sydney, Australia
 Cranbrook Elementary School, Columbus, Ohio, USA

Other uses
 Plymouth Cranbrook, an automobile produced from 1951 to 1953
 "Cranbrook" (hymn tune)